This is a list of converts to the Baha'i Faith organised by former religion.

Converted from Abrahamic religions

From Islam
Most of the early followers of Baháʼu'lláh came from an Islamic background.

Mírzá Abu'l-Faḍl (1844–1914) – foremost Baháʼí scholar who helped spread the Baháʼí Faith in Egypt, Turkmenistan, and the United States.
Mishkín-Qalam (1826–1912) – prominent Baháʼí and one of the nineteen Apostles of Baháʼu'lláh, as well as a famous calligrapher of 19th-century Persia.
Táhirih (1814 or 1817 – August 16–27, 1852) – Persian poet and theologian of the Bábí faith in Iran.
Nabíl-i-Aʻzam (1831–1892) – Baháʼí historian and one of the nineteen Apostles of Baháʼu'lláh
Hají Ákhúnd (1842–1910) – eminent follower of Baháʼu'lláh. He was appointed a Hand of the Cause, and identified as one of the nineteen Apostles of Baháʼu'lláh.
 Ibn-i-Abhar (died 1917) – appointed a Hand of the Cause, and identified as one of the nineteen Apostles of Baháʼu'lláh.
 Mírzá Mahmúd (died 1927/1928) – eminent follower of Baháʼu'lláh, the founder of the Baháʼí Faith.
 Núrayn-i-Nayyirayn – two brothers who were beheaded in the city of Isfahan in 1879.
 Somaya Ramadan (born 1951) – 2001 winner of the Naguib Mahfouz Medal for Literature.
 Hasan M. Balyuzi (1908–1980) – a descendant of relatives of the Báb, he was nevertheless a Muslim until he joined the religion following developing a friendship with Shoghi Effendi circa 1925, and eventually was named a Hand of the Cause of God.

From Judaism
 Lidia Zamenhof (1904–1942) – Polish writer, translator, active promoter of Esperanto (daughter of L. L. Zamenhof, the creator of Esperanto), killed by Germans during the Holocaust.
 John Ferraby (1914–1973) – British, Baháʼí Hand of the Cause
 Flora Purim (born 1942) – Brazilian jazz singer
 Ethel Jenner Rosenberg (1858–1930) – painter, the first English Baháʼí, secretary and publisher of Baháʼí books.
 Steve Sarowitz (born 1965/1966) – American billionaire businessman, the founder of Paylocity.

From Christianity

Russell Garcia (1916–2011) – motion picture composer
Khalil Greene (born 1979) – shortstop for the Texas Rangers
David Krummenacker (born 1975) – Track & Field indoor World Champion in 800m in 2003, NCAA Champion (Georgia Tech) 1997, 1998
Jacqueline Left Hand Bull (born 1943) – Indian Health care policy administrator (from Catholicism)
Queen Marie of Romania (1875–1938) – final Queen of Romania as the wife of King Ferdinand I.
Luke McPharlin (born 1981) – Australian footballer for the Fremantle Dockers
Julia Lynch Olin (1882–1961) – American author and Baháʼí who co-founded the New History Society in New York City.
Enoch Olinga (1926–1979) – born to an Anglican earned the title Hand of the Cause of God.
Mason Remey (1874–1974) – prominent American Baháʼí.

Converted from unknown religions
 Arvid Nelson – American comic book writer, best known for Rex Mundi 
Zhang Xin (born 1965) – Chinese businesswoman.
David Kelly (1944–2003) – former employee of the British Ministry of Defence and a United Nations weapons inspector in Iraq who was an authority on biological warfare.

See also
 List of Baháʼís

Further reading

References

B